Trichoscypha bijuga is a species of plant in the family Anacardiaceae. It is found in Cameroon, Ivory Coast, Equatorial Guinea, Ghana, Guinea, and Liberia. Its natural habitat is subtropical or tropical moist lowland forests. It is threatened by habitat loss.

References

bijuga
Near threatened plants
Taxonomy articles created by Polbot